Ronald George Thwaites (born February 12, 1945) is a Jamaican attorney-at-law and politician, representing the People's National Party (PNP). He was Member of Parliament (MP) for the constituency of Kingston Central, serving from 1989 to 2002, and again from 2007 to 2020. He served as Minister of  Education from 2012 to 2016.

Early life and education
Thwaites was born on February 12, 1945, in St Andrew. He is the son of Ronald George Thwaites and Lena May Thwaites (née D'Costa).  He received his early education at Westbrook Preparatory School and St George's College. Thwaites was awarded the Jamaica Scholarship to Cornell University, where he was editor-in-chief of The Cornell Daily Sun and a member of the Quill and Dagger society. In 1968 he won a Rhodes Scholarship to Campion Hall, Oxford. He also attended the University of the West Indies, and Gray's Inn, London.

Legal career
Thwaites founded the Kingston Legal Aid Clinic in 1972 and was its managing director from 1972 to 1975. He also co-founded the Montego Bay Legal Aid Clinic in 1974. He has been a partner in the law firm Daly, Thwaites and Company since 1979.

Political career
Thwaites was first elected Member of Parliament for the constituency of Kingston Central in the 1997 general election, polling 6,907 votes to 4,643 for Christine Davis for the Jamaica Labour Party (JLP). He did not seek re-election in the 2002 general election, but was again re-elected to Parliament in 2007, polling 5,210 votes to the JLP's Charlton Collie (3,745). In May 2011 he was named the Opposition Spokesperson on Education and in January 2012 was appointed Minister of Education in the Portia Simpson-Miller cabinet after the PNP won the 2011 general election. In 2020, Thwaites decided not to seek re-election in the 2020 general elections.

Personal life
Thwaites is married to Marcia Veronica Thwaites (née McKenley) and has five sons and two daughters.

See also
 List of Education Ministers of Jamaica

References

1945 births
People from Saint Andrew Parish, Jamaica
Education Ministers of Jamaica
Government ministers of Jamaica
Jamaican Rhodes Scholars
People's National Party (Jamaica) politicians
Cornell University alumni
Living people
Members of the 13th Parliament of Jamaica